The 2016 Rugby Americas North Championship, the ninth edition of NACRA Rugby Championship, is a rugby union championship for Tier 3 North American and Caribbean teams. Pool play takes place between 3 March and 2 July. Unlike the 2015 edition of the tournament, teams are split into North and South zones, but not Championships and Cups. As this edition of the tournament doubles as a round of qualification for the 2019 Rugby World Cup, only full members of World Rugby will compete.

Teams 

Nine teams will participate in the 2016 tournament.

Notable changes from last year: Jamaica returns to participate in the qualifier. Saint Lucia, British Virgin Islands, Curacao, Turks and Caicos Islands and USA South are not participating, as they are not full members of World Rugby

Qualifier

North Zone

Pre-tournament World Rugby Rankings in parentheses.

Games

South Zone

Pre-tournament World Rugby Rankings in parentheses.

Games

Championship playoff

See also
 2019 Rugby World Cup – Americas qualification

References

External links 
 RAN Website

2016
2016 rugby union tournaments for national teams
2016 in North American rugby union
rugby union